Paul Douglas (born 2 May 1964) is an Irish boxer. He competed in the men's heavyweight event at the 1992 Summer Olympics.

References

External links
 

1964 births
Living people
Irish male boxers
Olympic boxers of Ireland
Boxers at the 1992 Summer Olympics
Boxers from Belfast
Male boxers from Northern Ireland
Boxers at the 1990 Commonwealth Games
Commonwealth Games bronze medallists for Northern Ireland
Commonwealth Games medallists in boxing
Heavyweight boxers
Medallists at the 1990 Commonwealth Games